Herman is the second album of the hip hop group 't Hof van Commerce.

Track listing
"Kemmelberg 1983 AD" – 0:47
"Bus Ommegangk" – 3:53
"Mag et ntwa mjir zin" – 4:46
"Le mental en métal" – 4:43 (with Lickweed)
"Kust noa kust noa kust" – 4:30
"Situoatie 666" – 5:27 (with TLP)
"Gele Stylo" – 2:33
"De zeune van nboas" – 4:56
"De doagn van plezier" – 5:16 (with Stijn Nijs)
"Nostalgie Wereldbeker" – 4:45
"De zommer van 98" – 5:32
"Bol" – 4:50
"Alphonse en de Bjistjes" – 3:37
"Ze woare der nog nie grji voarn" – 5:40
"Ik e de zunne" – 5:31 (with NBM)
"De boane noa de zunne" – 4:36

Personnel
't Hof van Commerce
 Flip Kowlier (beats, raps, instruments)
 Serge BZAa (rap)
 DJ 4T4 (beats, engineering, scratch, rap)

Guests
 Bietmeester Piet (beat, guitar, casio)
 U-man, Kra-Z, TLP, Stijn Nijs, NBM (rap)

References

1999 albums
't Hof van Commerce albums